Whittlebury Park is a golf and camping resort located in Whittlebury, South Northamptonshire, England, near Silverstone circuit.
The camping resort is home to 15,000 to 20,000 campers during the British Grand Prix, which is held every year on Silverstone circuit.

References

Golf clubs and courses in Northamptonshire
Resorts in England
Sports venues in Northamptonshire